Yvonne Buckingham is an English actress who appeared in a number of minor or background roles on episodes of British television series or in British films. She  played the title role, though only briefly appearing as the deceased victim, in the 1959 film Sapphire, but did appear in the lead role as Christine Keeler (who was not allowed to play herself) in the critically panned 1963 film The Christine Keeler Story.

Career

1950s
In an early role, Buckingham played the part of a saloon girl in the Jack Lee direct film Robbery Under Arms. In 1958, she played Mario's girlfriend in the comedy Next to No Time.
In 1959, Buckingham played the eponymous role in the film Sapphire about a young woman found murdered on Hampstead Heath, but she did not have a speaking part and appears only briefly, as a dead body and in photographs.

1960s
In 1962, she had a minor background role as “pretty girl” in the Neo Noir film, The Frightened City. In 1963, Buckingham played the lead role in The Keeler Affair, a film about Christine Keeler. Before Buckingham had secured the role, it was offered to Keeler who accepted it but because the Actors Equity did not accept her application, it meant that the other cast members could not perform with her.

1970s and 80s
In the late 1980s, she had a role in the Marcio Kogan, Isay Weinfeld directed film, Fogo e Paixão, which was a film about a bus tour through São Paulo where strange people are encountered. One of the tourists, a Japanese man called Kankeo (played by Ken Kaneko), filmed the event and shows it to his friends when he returns home.

Filmography

References

External links
 

1937 births
Living people
Actresses from Yorkshire
20th-century English actresses
English film actresses
English television actresses
Date of birth missing (living people)